= Juliane Gallina =

American intelligence official

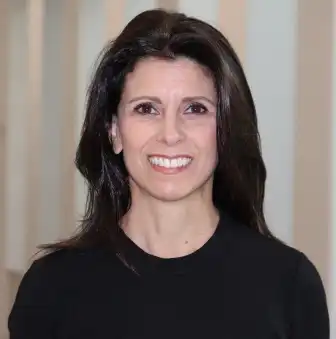

Deputy Director for Digital Innovation of the Central Intelligence Agency
- Incumbent
- Assumed office 2021
- President: Joe Biden
- Preceded by: Position established

Chief Information Officer of the Central Intelligence Agency
- In office 2019–2021
- President: Donald Trump; Joe Biden

Personal details
- Education: United States Naval Academy (BS) Naval Postgraduate School (MS)

Military service
- Branch/service: United States Navy
- Rank: Captain

Juliane Gallina is an American government official who has served in senior positions within the United States intelligence community. She is currently the Deputy Director for Digital Innovation (DDDI) at the Central Intelligence Agency (CIA), a role to which she was appointed in 2021.

== Early life and education ==
Gallina graduated from the United States Naval Academy in 1992, where she was the first woman appointed as the Brigade Commander, the highest-ranking midshipman. She holds a master's degree in electrical engineering from the Naval Postgraduate School.

== Career ==
Gallina's career has focused on technology, intelligence and information systems. Prior to her current role, she served as the Chief Information Officer (CIO) of the CIA. In this capacity, she was responsible for the agency's information technology enterprise. Her tenure as CIO included public appearances and discussions on IT modernization and cybersecurity within the federal government.

== Personal life ==
In 2024, multiple news outlets reported that Gallina's son, a U.S. citizen, was killed while fighting for Russia in Ukraine. The CIA confirmed the death of a staff member's son in a statement but did not name the individual, citing privacy concerns. This event drew significant media attention to Gallina's family.

== See also ==
- Central Intelligence Agency
- United States Naval Academy
- Naval Postgraduate School
